Donelson Christian Academy is a private, K4-12 Christian school that was founded in 1971. For its first three years classes were held in the Donelson Free Will Baptist Church, across from McGavock High School. In 1974, the school moved to Nashville, Tennessee.

History
Donelson Christian Academy experienced significant damage during the March 2020 Tennessee tornado outbreak and has been closed until further notice.

Accreditation and memberships

Donelson Christian Academy is accredited by the State of Tennessee and the Southern Association of Colleges and Schools.  It is a member of the Tennessee Association of Independent Schools and the Association of Christian Schools International.

Student activities

Donelson Christian Academy has sports teams in softball, tennis, and football. In 2011, its tennis team qualified for the state championship.  It sent a male doubles team and a female, both of which brought home medals. In 2012 the boys basketball team won the state championship.

DCA competes in bowling sanctioned by the Tennessee Secondary School Athletic Association.

The school has a competitive show choir, Legacy. The school also hosted its first competition, the Music City Show Choir Invitational, in 2020;  the contest was held less than a week before the school was hit by a tornado.

Notable alumni

Nate Bargatze – American stand-up comedian and host of the Nateland Podcast.

References 

Christian schools in Tennessee
Schools in Nashville, Tennessee
Private K-12 schools in Tennessee
Educational institutions established in 1971